The 1992 Nichirei International Championships was a women's tennis tournament played on outdoor hard courts at the Ariake Coliseum in Tokyo, Japan that was part of Tier II of the 1992 WTA Tour. It was the third edition of the tournament and was held from 22 September through 27 September 1992. First-seeded Monica Seles won the singles title and earned $70,000 first-prize money.

Finals

Singles

 Monica Seles defeated  Gabriela Sabatini 6–2, 6–0
 It was Seles' 8th singles title of the year and the 28th of her career.

Doubles

 Mary Joe Fernández /  Robin White defeated  Yayuk Basuki /  Nana Miyagi 6–4, 6–4

References

External links
 ITF tournament edition details
 Tournament draws

Nichirei International Championships
Nichirei International Championships
1992 in Japanese tennis
1992 in Japanese women's sport